Nevada is a municipality in the province of Granada, Spain. As of 2010, it has a population of 1179 inhabitants.

References

Municipalities in the Province of Granada